This is a list of original and International programming broadcast on the television channel ARY Digital, which is broadcast in Pakistan and around the world. The channel also broadcasts religious shows during Islamic events.

Current broadcast

Serials

Sitcom

Non-scripted/reality shows

Formerly notable broadcast

Anthologies

Gulzar Classics
Kahani Aik Raat Ki

Comedy/Sitcoms

Aadat Se Majboor
Aankhon Aankhon Main
Aik Bechara
Barfi Laddu
Badtameez
Batashay
Bewaqoofiyan
Bhatti Ki Buss Ho Gayee
Billo Bablu & Bhaiyya
Boom Boom
Bulbulay Series
Bulbulay
By Chance
Chocolate
Chup Chupa Kay
Dhoom Dharakka
Dil To Kachha Hai Jee
Dilli Wale Dulare Babu
Do Biviyan Ek Bechara
Dugdugi
Dum Dum Dee Dee
Eid Deed
Eik Or Eik Dhai
Family Band
Good News
Ghar Jamai
Ganday Bachay
Hey Girlz
Happily Married
Happy Ending
Jalaibi
Jeena Toh Yahi Hai
Kamal House
Karachi High
Kya Life Hai Series
Kya Life Hai
Kya Life Hai 2
Khatoon Manzil
Khatti Meethi Aur Namkeen
Main Aur Tum Series
Main Aur Tum
Main Aur Tum 2.0
Main Aur Tum Phir Se
Main Minister Banu Ga
Main Banon Ga Minister
Meri Teri Kahani
Meem Musibat
Mun Meetha Karo
Nok Jhok
Namak Paray
Neeli Chatri
Oops!
Parody punch (4 episodes) 
Pasoodi
Pyaar Mein Twist
Such Much
Sabun Style Awards
Shadi Mubarak
Quddusi Sahab Ki Bewah
Redz
Rasgullay
Rubber Band
 Timmy G Series
Timmy G
Timmy G Reloaded
Tujh Pe Qurban
Topi Drama
Total Siyapaa
Take Away
Takleef Maaf
Up and Down

Drama series

93 Shumali
Aangan
Aap Ke Liye
Ab Kar Meri Rafugari
Aey Ishq Humain Barbaad Na Kar
Agar Tum Mil Jao
Aik Chin Gari
Aisi Hai Tanhai
Aitraz
Aks
Alif Laila
Ana
Anabia
Anarkali
Arranged Marriage
Aulaad
Aur Phir
Baandi
Babban Khala Ki Betiyann
Baddua
Badnaam
Badtameez
Balaa
Barsaath Raat Ki
Bay Dardi
Bay Emaan Mohabbat
Bay Khudi
Bay Qasoor
Berukhi
Besharam
 Beti
Bewafa
Bhabhi
Bharday Jholy
Bhool 
Bikhray Moti
Chand Chariya
Chand Ki Pariyan
Cheekh
Chup Raho
Daam
Daagh
Daddy
 Damsa
Daraar
Darmiyaan
Deewangi
Dhadkan
Dil Lagi
Diya Jalay
Dil Mom Ka Diya
Dil Nahin Manta
Do Bol
Doosri Biwi
Dost
Dunk
Dushman-e-Jaan
Ek Mohabbat Kay Baad
Faisla
Fraud  
Ghairat
Ghalati
Ghayal
Ghisi Piti Mohabbat
Goya
 Gul-o-Gulzar
Gumm
Guzaarish
Haal-e-Dil
Habs  
Hania
Haiwaan
Hasad
Ijazat
Iltija
Ishqiya
Ishq Hai
Ishq Parast
Jaal
Jaane Kyun
Jalan
Jhooti
Judaai
Justuju
Kaafir
Kaash Aisa Ho
Kabhi Na Houn Hum Juda
Kabhi Kabhi
Kaisa Hai Naseeban
Kaisa Yeh Junoon
Kaisi Yeh Dooriyan
Kaisi Teri Khudgarzi 
Kaneez
Kasak
Khasara
Khata
Khoat
Khuda Mera Bhi Hai
Khuda na karay
Khudgarz
Khudparast
Khushi Ek Roag
Koi To Ho
Koi Tou Baarish
Koi Chand Rakh
Koi Nahi Apna
Kuch Ankahi Baatein
Kuch Khwab Thay Meray
Kuch Pyar Ka Pagalpan
Lamha Lamha Zindagi
Lashkara
Log Kya Kahenge
Maamta
Maang
Maaye Ni
Mein Bushra
Main Chand Si
Main Gunehgar Nahi
Manzil
Maya
Mendhi
Meraas
Mera Dil
Mera Pehla Pyaar
Mera Saaein Series
Mera Saaein
Mera Saaein 2
Mera Yaar Miladay
Mera Yaqeen
 Meray Paas Tum Ho 
Mere Ajnabi
Mere Apne
Mere Apne
Mere Dard Ki Tujhe Kya Khabar
Mere Jevan Sathi
Mere Hamrahi
Mere Harjai
Mere Humnawa
Mere Humsafar
Mere Khudaya
Meri Beti
Meri Guriya
Meri Ladli
Meri Nanhi Pari
Milay Kuch Youn
Moorat
Moray Saiyaan
Mubarak Ho Beti Hui Hai
Muqabil
My Dear Sotan
Naimat
Naraaz
Neeyat
Nibah
Noor ul Ain
Omer Dadi Aur Gharwale
Pachtawa
Parchhaiyan
Pardes
Parvarish
Pehli Si Muhabbat
Phir Kho Jaye Nah
Prem Gali
Pukaar
Pul Sirat
Pyar Deewangi Hai
Pyarey Afzal
Qarz
Qurban
Qurbat
Qudrat
Rang Laaga
Rasm E Duniya
Rishtay Biktay Hain
Riyasat
Roag
Roza Kay Roze
 Ruswai
Soteli
Socha Na Tha (2008)
Saans
Sabz Qadam
Sarkar Sahab
Shehnai
Shadi Mubarak Ho
Shab e Arzoo Ka Alam
Shikwa
Shiza
Shukk
Sherdil Beyond The Skies
Sinf-e-Aahan
Sun Leyna
Syskiyaan
Sun Yaara
Surkh Chandni
Tanhaiyan Naye Silsilay
Tere Liye
Teri Chah Mein
Teri Raza
Thakan
 Thora Sa Haq
Tum Meri Ho
Tum Milay
Tum Yaad Aaye
Tumhare Hain
Tumse Mil Kay
Tikaun
Tania
Tareekiyan
Umm-e-Kulsoom
Veena
Vasl-e-Yaar
Visaal
Waada
Woh Mera Dil Tha
Yeh Ishq
Yeh Muhabatein
Yeh Na Thi Hamari Qismat
Yeh Vaada Rahha
Yeh Shadi Nahi Ho Sakti
Zaakham
Zara Aur Mehrunnisa
Zard Zamano Ka Sawera
Zinda Dargor
Zindaan
Zindagi Dhoop Tum Ghana Saya
Zevar

Horror/Supernatural

 Bandish
 Kaala Jaadu Series
 Kaala Jaadu
 Kaala Jaadu 2
 Neeli Zinda Hai
 Sannata

Long format/Soaps

Abhi Abhi
Angna
Aross Paross
Azmaish
Aik Sitam Aur
Babul Ki Duayein Leti Ja
Bahu Rani
Bandhan
Bechari Nadia
Benaam
Betiyaan
Bharaas
Bharosa
Bubbly Kya Chahti Hai
Chandni Begum
Dard Ka Rishta
Dareecha
Dehleez
Dil-e-Barbaad
Dil-E-Veeran
Dil Dard Dhuan
Ek Hi Bhool
Faryaad
Gardish
Gulnar Bano
Guriya Rani
Jatan
Kab Mere Kehlaoge
Katto
Khandan-e-Shugila
Khushboo Ka Ghar
Khwaab Nagar Ki Shehzadi
Khwaish
Maala
Main Haari
Mann-e-Iltija
Matam
Meenu Ka Susral
Mehmoodabad Ki Malkain
Mein Hari Piya
Mein Mehru Hoon
Mera Aangan
 Mera Dil Mera Dushman
Mera Qasoor
Meray Naseeb Ki Baarishain
Mere Sanwariya Ka Naam
Meri Behan Meri Dewrani
Meri Baji
Mohay Piya Rang Laga
Morr Uss Gali Ka
Mujhe Qubool Hai
Mujhay Vida Kar 
Muqaddar Ka Sitara
Nand
Pakeeza Phuppo
Piya Kay Ghar Jana Hai
Piya Ka Ghar Pyara Lage
Qismat
Rani Beti Raj Karay
Riffat Aapa Ki Bahuein
Rishta Anjana Sa
Saans
Saheliyaan
Shehr e Yaran
Sheher e Dil Kay Darwaze
Shehzada Saleem
Sotayli
Taqdeer
Teri Rah Mein
Tootay Huay Taare
Woh Pagal Si

Miniseries

Aakhri Station
Sar-E-Rah

Non-Scripted/Reality shows

ARY Celebrity League
ARY Star Gold Quiz
Aaj Bhi Yaad Hay
Always Girls Can
Baby Say Na
Battle of the Bands
Buch Kay Rehna Re Baba
Billionaire Game Show
Click n Win
Chupa Rustom
Coke Studio (Pakistan)
Comedy Kings Series
Comedy Kings: Zara Hutt Kay
Comedy Kings: The Real Muqabla
Comedy Kings: Ek Naya Tamasha
Comedy Kings: Naya Funda
Comedy Kings: Ki Shehanshah Kon
Comedy Kings: Shehanshon Ki Shehanshah
Dum Hai Series
Dum Hai
Dum Hai Tou Entertain Kar
Dil Pe Mat Le Yaar with LL Cool J
Dhoom Dhamaal
Desi Kuriyan
Das pe Das
Eid Dhamaal
Eid Masti
Eid Hungama
Eid Apno Key Saath
Fun Won
Har Fun Maula
Hero Banay Ki Tarang
Jeet Kar Dikhao
King Is King
Kuch Kar Dikha
Kya Aap Banaingay Crorepati?
Main Bhi Qurbani
Madventures
Nachley
Pakistans Next Mega Star
Pakistan Music Stars
Revival
Reema Ka America
Super Kids Funda
Survivor Pakistan
Sprite Spice Wars
Tamasha
Tu Tu Main Main
The Ultimate Muqabla
Ultimate Challenge

Special programming

Bulbulay Special Series
 Bulbulay Eid Special
 Bulbulay Ramzan Special
 Bulbulay Valentine's Day Special
 Breakfast With Nadia Khan Eid Special
 GMP Shan-e-Suhoor
 Good Morning Pakistan Special Series
 Good Morning Pakistan New Year Special
 Good Morning Pakistan Valentine's Day Special
 Good Morning Pakistan Eid Special
 Good Morning Pakistan 6 September Special
 Good Morning Pakistan 14 August Special
 Good Morning Pakistan ARY 13rd Anniversary
 Good Morning Pakistan ARY 14th Anniversary
 Good Morning Pakistan ARY 15th Anniversary
 Good Morning Pakistan ARY 16th Anniversary
 Good Morning Pakistan ARY 17th Anniversary
 Good Morning Pakistan ARY 18th Anniversary
 Good Morning Pakistan ARY 19th Anniversary
 Good Morning Pakistan ARY 20th Anniversary
 Good Morning Pakistan ARY 21st Anniversary
 Good Morning Pakistan Women's Day Special
 Good Morning Pakistan Mother's Day Special
 Good Morning Pakistan Chand Raat Special
 Good Morning Pakistan Rabi-ul-Awwal Special
 Good Morning Pakistan Golden Memories Special
  Jeeto Pakistan Special series
 Jeeto Pakistan Valentine's Day Special
 Jeeto Pakistan Ramzan Special
 Jeeto Pakistan Eid Special
 Jeeto Pakistan Women's Special
 Jeeto Pakistan Mother's Day Special
 Jeeto Pakistan 14 August Special
 Jeeto Pakistan Lahore Special
 Jeeto Pakistan Lahore Special 2
 Jeeto Pakistan Multan Special
 Jeeto Pakistan Karachi Kings Special
 Jeeto Pakistan Hyderabad Special
 Jeeto Pakistan 50th Episode Special
 Jeeto Pakistan 100th Episode Special
 Jeeto Pakistan 600th Episode Special
 Jeeto Pakistan 700th Episode Special
 Jeeto Pakistan League Series
 Jeeto Pakistan League (season 1)
 Loose Talk Special Series
 Loose Talk Eid Special
 Loose Talk New Year Special
 Loose Talk Azadi Special
 Loose Talk ARY 4th Anniversary
 Loose Talk 4th Anniversary Special
 Loose Talk Cricket Special
 Lyari King Live Special Series
 Lyari King 50th Episode Special
 Lyari King 100th Episode Special
 Lyari King Eid-ul-Adha Special
 Lyari King ARY 5th Anniversary
 Marina Mornings Special Series
 Marina Mornings Dhoop Kinare Special
 Marina Mornings Eid Special
 Mere Pass Tum Ho-Special Show
 Nachley Eid Special
 Shan e Mustafa
 Shan e Ramazan

Talk shows

Aalim Aur Alam
Aik Aur Pehloo With Sania Saeed
Aap Hum Aur Aap
Aap Ki Awaz Atiqa Odho Ke Saath
Bun Kabab
Baaton Baaton Mein
Bakra Shopping
Brand Watch
Breakfast Show With Nadia Khan
Catwalk
Chef
Daily Cooking
Dilpazeer Show
Dr.Shaista and You
Eid Kay Chatkaray
Eid Pe Bollywood Ka Salam
Ghaffars at Dhorajee
Ghabrana Mana Hai
Itwar Ke Itwar
Khich Khich
Lines of Style
Loose Talk
Lyari King Live
Late Night Show With Sajid Hasan
Fashion Stop
Happenings
Heart To Heart With Samina Peerzada
Mehmaan
Marina Mornings
Masal Dar Masal with Bushra Ansari
Raja Ke Saath
Sangam
Sajid's Superstars
Saturday Night Special
Sunehray Log
Start Cup Action
Style Arabia
The Mothers Show
The Luci and Shuffu Show
Tareekian
What Women Want
Weekend Show
Yaadein
Yeh Ghar To Akhir Apna Hay

Foreign series
24
Agents of S.H.I.E.L.D.
Bigg Boss
Cold Case
Cops
Fear Factor - Khatron Ke Khiladi
Lost
NCIS

Awards shows

 Apsara Awards
 ARY Film Awards
 1st ARY Film Awards
 2nd ARY Film Awards
 LUX Style Awards
 1st Lux Style Awards
 2nd Lux Style Awards
 3rd Lux Style Awards
 4th Lux Style Awards
 5th Lux Style Awards
 6th Lux Style Awards
 7th Lux Style Awards
 8th Lux Style Awards
 9th Lux Style Awards
 10th Lux Style Awards
 11th Lux Style Awards
 12th Lux Style Awards
 13th Lux Style Awards
 14th Lux Style Awards
 Zee Cine Awards
 Social Media Awards
 Stardust Awards
 The Musik Awards 08
 Umang
 Viewers Choice Awards
 Veet Celebration of Beauty
 People Choice Awards
 IIFA Awards
 6th IIFA Awards
 7th IIFA Awards
 8th IIFA Awards

Special events
 Cricket World Cup
 Moto GP
 Fashion Shows
 NFL

See also 
 List of programs broadcast by Geo TV
 List of programs broadcast by Hum TV
List of Programmes Broadcast by BOL Entertainment

References

External links
 ARY Digital programs

Original programming by Pakistani television network or channel
Lists of television series by network
Pakistani television-related lists